Eli Lilly and Company v. Medtronic, Inc., 496 U.S. 661 (1990), is a United States Supreme Court case related to patent infringement in the medical device industry.  It held that (e)(1) of United States patent law exempted premarketing activity conducted to gain approval of a device under the Federal Food, Drug, and Cosmetic Act from a finding of infringement.

See also
 Medtronic, Inc. v. Lohr (1996)
 Riegel v. Medtronic, Inc. (2008)
 List of United States Supreme Court cases, volume 496

References

External links

Biotechnology law
Eli Lilly and Company
United States Supreme Court cases
United States Supreme Court cases of the Rehnquist Court
United States patent case law
1990 in United States case law
Medtronic litigation